The 2004 Middle Tennessee Blue Raiders football team represented Middle Tennessee State University as a member of the Sun Belt Conference during the 2004 NCAA Division I FBS football season. Led by sixth-year head coach Andy McCollum, the Blue Raiders compiled an overall record of 5–6 with a mark of 4–4 in conference play, tying for fourth in the Sun Belt. Middle Tennessee played home games at Johnny "Red" Floyd Stadium in Murfreesboro, Tennessee.

Schedule

References

Middle Tennessee
Middle Tennessee Blue Raiders football seasons
Middle Tennessee Blue Raiders football